Mashivka is an urban-type settlement in northeastern Ukraine, and was formerly the administrative center of Mashivka Raion. It is now administered within Poltava Raion of Poltava Oblast. The settlement is located on the left bank of the Tahamlyk, a tributary of the Vorskla in the drainage basin of the Dnieper. Population:

Economy

Transportation
The settlement has road access to Poltava and Krasnohrad, with further access via highways to Kharkiv and Dnipro.

Mashivka railway station is on the railway connecting Poltava and Krasnohrad. There is infrequent passenger traffic.

References

Urban-type settlements in Poltava Raion